Michel Lachance (born April 11, 1955) is a Canadian former professional ice hockey defenceman who played 21 games in the National Hockey League for the Colorado Rockies. As a youth, he played in the 1967 Quebec International Pee-Wee Hockey Tournament with the Quebec Citadelle minor ice hockey team.

Career statistics

Regular season and playoffs

References

External links
 

1955 births
Living people
Baltimore Clippers (SHL) players
Canadian ice hockey defencemen
Cleveland Crusaders draft picks
Colorado Rockies (NHL) players
Drakkars de Caen players
Fort Worth Texans players
Greensboro Generals (SHL) players
Ice hockey people from Quebec City
Maine Nordiques players
Montreal Bleu Blanc Rouge players
Montreal Canadiens draft picks
New Brunswick Hawks players
Philadelphia Firebirds (AHL) players
Quebec Remparts players
Tulsa Oilers (1964–1984) players